Van Goethem is a surname. Notable people with the surname include:

Kenneth Van Goethem (born 1984), Belgian footballer
Marie van Goethem (1865–?), French ballet dancer and artist's model
Patrick Van Goethem (born 1969), Belgian opera singer

Surnames of Dutch origin